In statistical physics, the Smoluchowski coagulation equation is a population balance equation introduced by Marian Smoluchowski in a seminal 1916 publication, describing the time evolution of the number density of particles as they coagulate (in this context "clumping together") to size x at time t.

Simultaneous coagulation (or aggregation) is encountered in processes involving polymerization, coalescence of aerosols, emulsication, flocculation.

Equation

The distribution of particle size changes in time according to the interrelation of all particles of the system. Therefore, the Smoluchowski coagulation equation is an integrodifferential equation of the particle-size distribution. In the case when the sizes of the coagulated particles are continuous variables, the equation involves an integral:

 

If dy is interpreted as a discrete measure, i.e. when particles join in discrete sizes, then the discrete form of the equation is a summation:

 

There exists a unique solution for a chosen kernel function.

Coagulation kernel

The operator, K, is known as the coagulation kernel and describes the rate at which particles of size  coagulate with particles of size .  Analytic solutions to the equation exist when the kernel takes one of three simple forms:

 

known as the constant, additive, and multiplicative kernels respectively. For the case  it could be mathematically proven that the solution of Smoluchowski coagulation equations have asymptotically the dynamic scaling property. This self-similar behaviour is closely related to scale invariance which can be a characteristic feature of a phase transition.

However, in most practical applications the kernel takes on a significantly more complex form. For example, the free-molecular kernel which describes collisions in a dilute gas-phase system,

 

Some coagulation kernels account for a specific fractal dimension of the clusters, as in the diffusion-limited aggregation:
 
or Reaction-limited aggregation:
 
For cloud, the kernel for coagulation of cloud particles are usually expressed as:
  

Generally the coagulation equations that result from such physically realistic kernels are not solvable, and as such, it is necessary to appeal to numerical methods.  Most of deterministic methods can be used when there is only one particle property (x) of interest, the two principal ones being the method of moments and sectional methods.  In the multi-variate case, however, when two or more properties (such as size, shape, composition, etc.) are introduced, one has to seek special approximation methods that suffer less from curse of dimensionality. Approximation based on Gaussian radial basis functions has been successfully applied to the coagulation equation in more than one dimension.

When the accuracy of the solution is not of primary importance,  stochastic particle (Monte Carlo) methods are an attractive alternative.

Condensation-driven aggregation

In addition to aggregation, particles may also grow in size by condensation, deposition or by 
accretion. Hassan and Hassan recently proposed a condensation-driven aggregation (CDA) model in which aggregating particles keep growing continuously between merging upon collision. The CDA model can be understood by the following reaction scheme

This reaction scheme can be described by the following generalized Smoluchowski equation

One can solve the generalized Smoluchowski equation for constant kernel to give 

which exhibits dynamic scaling. 
A simple fractal analysis reveals that the condensation-driven aggregation can be best described fractal of dimension

 
Such conservation law has also been found in Cantor set too.

See also
Einstein–Smoluchowski relation
Flocculation
Smoluchowski factor
Williams spray equation

References

Differential equations
Statistical mechanics